Benedetto Lo Monaco is an Italian actor, known for his work in many Italian movies.

Biography 
Lo Monaco started his artistic career when he was sixteen, when he took part in the Filodrammatica (amateur dramatic society) in the Church of Saint Anne in Alcamo. He is a well regarded actor, who has been in the field for 42 years. He has attended the following acting stages:
2005: Method Strasberg-Actors' studio of New York City directed by Marilyn Fried, at the Theatre Cielo d'Alcamo
2007: Method of theatre workshop led by Jean-Paul Denizon, at the Theatre Cielo d'Alcamo
2007: Method of theatre workshop led by the directors Giles Smith and Giorgio Serafini Prosperi
Lo Monaco has worked with several famous directors such as; Giuseppe Tornatore, Ricky Tognazzi and Salvo Bonaffini and has also acted in the TV series I Cesaroni V with Claudio Amendola and Elena Sofia Ricci.
In the film Pagate Fratelli, Benedetto acted among more well known actors, such as Tony Sperandeo and Gigi Burruano. Currently he has an enviable curriculum in the field of cinema. During his career he has won three festivals, including the Giffoni Film Festival in 2013.

He has also collaborated on a project with the Calandra & Calandra, a famous duo from Alcamo, who have a repertoire of folk music.

Career

Theatre 
 1980 Gatta ci cova
 1982 L'arte di Giufà
 1983 La Buon Anima Di Mia Suocera
 1987 A View from the Bridge
 1995 Don Sasà Possotutto
 1996 La Passione Di Cristo
 2005 I Civitoti in Pretura
 2006 Cavaliere Petagna
 2007 Una storia Siciliana
 2008 Fiat voluntas dei

Films 
 1989 Pummarò by Michele Placido
 2007 Il dolce e l'amaro by Andrea Porporati, a mafioso
 2008 Io, Don Giovanni by Carlos Saura, generico specializzato
 2008 La Tomba Dei Giganti di Ricky Tognazzi, enologist
 2008 Doppio gioco by Andrea Vicari e Riccando Rosce, Giufrè
 2008 Il Divo by Paolo Sorrentino, Carabiniere
 2008 Baaria by Giuseppe Tornatore, the Democrazia Cristiana secretary
 2008 Viola di mare by Donatella Maiorca, Don Tano
 2011 Pagate Fratelli by Salvatore Bonaffini, Father Carmelo, the protagonist
 2012 La mafia alternativa, tra vita, morte e...miracoli by Nicola Barnaba, Michele
 2013: Klepsidra by Salvo Onello, the hotel director
 2013: Lo chiamavano nullità by Giovanni Cangelosi, balordo
 2014: Leaves Of The Tree by Ante Novakovic, Cardinale
 2014: Angeli by Salvatore Bonaffini, nonno
 2015: Atto III by Francesco Zucchetti (got a prize at the Cici film festival a Castellammare del Golfo)
 2015: Il santo senza parole by Tony Gangitano, eremita
 2016: Oro e Piombo by Emiliano Ferrera, an outlaw
 2018: Rocco Chinnici
 2018: I nostri figli, Tv movie
 2020: Rocco, Giuseppe
 2022: L'infiltrato by Antonio Giaimo

Cortos 
 2009: Per un semplice gesto by Giovanni Spadone, protagonist
 2009: Il letto by Accursio Graffeo, protagonist
 2010: Artefatto in ospedale, by Andrea Clauser e Dario Lo Presti, infermiere professionale
 2010: Random, by Emiliano Ferrera, coprotagonista
 2012: La mafia alternativa, tra vita, morte e miracoli, by Michele Ainis
 2013: Diverse esistenze, by Salvatore Bonaffini, the headmaster (winner at the Giffoni Film Festival)
 2013: Troppo dentro il west by Diana e Andrea, the protagonist (winner of the prize Cici film festival)
 2014: Capitano Biancamano, the protagonist (winner of two prizes at the Cici film festival and Corto Ferrara)
 2014: Il viaggio della vita, the priest
 2016: Un pugno di sabbia, directed by Salvo Bonaffini (winner of the "Castro Film Festival Puglia" as the Best Subject, and selected at the  Borgia Film Festival 2017
2017: Prometta mi, grandfather
2020: Rocco, Giuseppe

TV Fiction 
 2005 Cefalonia by Riccardo Milani,  lieutenant colonel 
 2005 Montalbano by Alberto Sironii
 2007 Il Generale dalla Chiesa by Giorgio Capitani, a magistrate
 2008 Paolo VI by Fabrizio Costa, a nobleman
 2008 Doppio gioco by Lazzaretti and Matteo Lena, Giufrè
 2008 Caso Mattei by Giorgio Capitani, the Sicilian man
 2011: I Cesaroni (a judge)

Commercials 
 1995 Sport and housewares sectors, Marcello Grimaudo (on Alpa 1)

Video clips 
 2012: , the co-protagonist
 2013: , the protagonist

Sitcom 
2011 "Le famiglie Caserecce" directed by Philippe Giangreco, the protagonist

Radio 
Speaker at Radio Alcamo Centrale

Spots 
 2014: Bum Bum – Bathfoam
 2015: Deliziosa, a commercial on a cheese made in Apulia (Canale5 and RAI).

Personal life
Benedetto Lo Monaco is a regional champion of skating. His hobbies include racing, breeding animals, and music.  Lo Monaco is also an experienced cook and butcher.

See also
Giacomo Romano Davare
Compagnia Piccolo Teatro (Alcamo)
Church of Saint Anne (Alcamo)
I Cesaroni

References

Sources

External links 

1960 births
Living people
People from Alcamo
Italian male stage actors
Italian male film actors
Italian comedians
Actors from Sicily